EMRA may refer to:

East Midlands Regional Assembly, a regional assembly in the United Kingdom
Eastern and Midland Regional Assembly, a regional assembly in Ireland
Emergency Medicine Residents' Association, an American medical organization
Energy Market Regulatory Authority, see Energy in Turkey